Lincoln is a town in Middlesex County, Massachusetts. The population was 7,014 according to the 2020 United States Census, including residents of Hanscom Air Force Base that live within town limits. The town, located in the MetroWest region of Boston's suburbs, has a rich colonial history and large amounts of public conservation land.

History 
Lincoln was settled by Europeans in 1654, as a part of Concord. The majority of Lincoln was formed by splitting off a substantial piece of southeast Concord and incorporated as a separate town in 1754. Due to their "difficulties and inconveniences by reason of their distance from the places of Public Worship in their respective Towns," local inhabitants petitioned the General Court to be set apart as a separate town. Because the new town was composed of parts "nipped" off from the adjacent towns of Concord, Weston (which itself had been part of Watertown) and Lexington (which itself had been part of Cambridge), it was sometimes referred to as "Niptown."

Chambers Russell, a Representative in the Court in Boston, was influential in the town's creation.  In gratitude, Russell was asked to name the new town.  He chose Lincoln, after his family home in Lincolnshire, England.  His homestead in Lincoln was later known as the Codman House property, which was occupied after his death by his relatives, the Codman family.

Lincoln is reportedly the only town in America named after Lincoln, England (and not the Revolutionary War Major General, Benjamin Lincoln or President Abraham Lincoln), although Lincoln, New Hampshire was named for the 9th Earl of Lincoln, an English nobleman and incorporated in 1764, 45 years before Abraham Lincoln's birth.

Paul Revere was captured by British soldiers in Lincoln on the night of April 18, 1775.  Minutemen from Lincoln were the first to arrive to reinforce the colonists protecting American stores of ammunition and arms in Concord.  Colonel Abijah Pierce of Lincoln led his troops, armed with a cane.  He upgraded his weapon to a British musket after the battle.  Five British soldiers who fell in Lincoln are buried in the town cemetery.  A substantial portion of the first battle of the Revolutionary War, the Battle of Lexington and Concord, was fought in Lincoln.

Reverend Charles Stearns (1753–1826), a Harvard-trained minister, served the Congregational Church in Lincoln from late 1781 until his death. Only a handful of his sermons were printed, most in the early 19th century. In addition, Stearns was principal of the Liberal School, a relatively progressive and coeducational institution that opened in early 1793. While at the school, Stearns wrote and published a number of education-related works, including Dramatic Dialogues for Use in Schools (1798), a collection of 30 original plays that were performed by the students. After the school closed in 1808, Stearns continued to tutor students privately.  Among his pupils were Nathan Brooks, a Concord lawyer, and George Russell, a Lincoln physician.  Stearns's published works can be accessed at Early American Imprints, a microform and digital collection produced by the American Antiquarian Society. A summary article that surveys Stearns as a producer of children's drama is "The Dramatic Dialogues of Charles Stearns: An Appreciation" by Jonathan Levy, in Spotlight on the Child: Studies in the History of American Children's Theatre, ed. Roger L. Bedard and C. John Tolch (New York: Greenwood, 1989): 5–24.

Education

Lincoln is home to one public K–8 school, the Lincoln School. High School students attend Lincoln-Sudbury Regional High School in Sudbury.
In December 2018, voters in Lincoln approved the construction of a new K–8 school building and a Proposition  property tax override to pay for the school. To date $80 million financing has been raised via bond issuance for a $93.9 million renovation project at Lincoln School.

Geography
(Source: United States Census Bureau).

Demographics

At the 2000 census, there were 8,056 people, 2,790 households and 2,254 families residing in the town. The racial makeup of the town was 87.16% White, 4.84% African American, 0.38% Native American, 4.17% Asian, 0.02% Pacific Islander, 1.33% from other races, and 2.09% from two or more races. Hispanic or Latino of any race were 2.97% of the population. The 21.03% drop in population between the 2010 and 2000 censuses was the largest of any municipality in Massachusetts. Diversity in the public schools is higher due to the METCO program.

There were 2,790 households, of which 45.6% had children under the age of 18 living with them, 73.4% were married couples living together, 5.4% had a female householder with no husband present, and 19.2% were non-families. Of all households 15.8% were made up of individuals, and 7.0% had someone living alone who was 65 years of age or older. The average household size was 2.83 and the average family size was 3.18.

Age distribution was 30.7% under the age of 18, 5.4% from 18 to 24, 31.2% from 25 to 44, 21.7% from 45 to 64, and 11.0% who were 65 years of age or older. The median age was 35 years. For every 100 females, there were 94.5 males. For every 100 females age 18 and over, there were 90.7 males.

The median household income was $120,844, and median family income was $202,704. Males had a median income of $142,788 versus $61,786 for females. The per capita income for the town was $74,402. About 0.3% of families and 0.8% of the population were below the poverty line, including 0.2% of those under age 18 and 2.4% of those age 65 or over.

The majority of the land in the town is zoned for residential and agricultural use.

Points of interest
 Bemis Hall
 Codman House
 DeCordova Museum and Sculpture Park
 Drumlin Farm
 The Food Project
 Gropius House
 Hanscom Field and Hanscom Air Force Base
 Hartwell Tavern
 Lincoln Center Historic District
 Lincoln Public Library
 Massachusetts Audubon Society Headquarters
 Mount Misery
 Virginia Road

Transportation
Commuter rail service from Boston's North Station is provided by the MBTA with a stop in Lincoln on its Fitchburg Line. Lincoln was previously home to a second railroad station, Baker Bridge station, which was the site of a deadly 1905 train wreck.

In popular culture
 The 1988 They Might Be Giants album Lincoln is named after the town, as it is the band's hometown.
 Lincoln is featured in the 2013 video game The Last of Us, as well as the 2023 HBO television adaption, although the game indicates that Lincoln is part of Amherst County, which does not exist; the real Amherst is a town approximately 75 miles west of Lincoln.

Notable people
Bradford Cannon, pioneer in reconstructive surgery
David Herbert Donald, professor and Pulitzer Prize-winning Author
Susan Fargo, Massachusetts state senator
John Farrar (scientist), Harvard scientist
John Flansburgh, musician from the alternative rock group They Might Be Giants
Julia Glass, author
Diana Golden (1963–2001), disabled ski racer
Harriet Louise Hardy, first woman professor at Harvard Medical School
Maggie Hassan, Senator, New Hampshire Governor
Greg Hawkes, keyboardist for The Cars
Charles Kindleberger, Economic Historian and author
John Linnell, musician, co-founder of They Might Be Giants
Nicholi Rogatkin, Professional Bike Rider
Joseph M. Sussman, MIT professor
Ray Tomlinson, computer programming pioneer, inventor of e-mail
Lester Thurow, Dean of MIT Sloan School, author
Patricia Warner, spy
Frank Wood, Tony Award-winning actor
Robert Coldwell Wood, political scientist, Under Secretary of the Department of Housing and Urban Development

See also
 The Carroll School
 Lincoln-Sudbury Regional High School

References

Further reading
 1871 Atlas of Massachusetts. by Wall & Gray.Map of Massachusetts. Map of Middlesex County.
 History of Middlesex County, Massachusetts, Volume 1 (A-H), Volume 2 (L-W) compiled by Samuel Adams Drake, published 1879 and 1880. 572 and 505 pages. Lincoln section by William F. Wheeler in volume 2 pages 34–43.
 1940 US Census:  enumeration districts 9-207 and 9-208

External links

 Town of Lincoln official website
 Lincoln Public Schools

 
Towns in Massachusetts
Towns in Middlesex County, Massachusetts